Aleksandar Vladimirov Nikolov (born 30 November 2003) is a Bulgarian professional volleyball player. He is a member of the Bulgaria national team. At the professional club level, he plays for Cucine Lube Civitanova.

Personal life
Nikolov was born in Tours, France, when his father Vladimir was playing for the local Tours VB. Aleksandar is one of the four children of Vladimir and his wife Maya, both of whom played volleyball professionally.

Honours

College
 National championships
 2022  NCAA National Championship, with Long Beach State Beach

Youth national team
 2021  FIVB U19 World Championship

Individual awards
 2021: FIVB U19 World Championship – Best Outside Spiker
 2022: NCAA National Championship – All Tournament Team
 2022: CEV U20 European Championship – Best Outside Spiker

References

External links
 
 Player profile at LegaVolley.it  
 Player profile at Volleybox.net
 Long Beach State Beach 2022 roster – Alex Nikolov

2003 births
Living people
Sportspeople from Tours, France
Bulgarian men's volleyball players
Bulgarian expatriate sportspeople in Italy
Expatriate volleyball players in Italy
Long Beach State Beach men's volleyball players
Outside hitters